

 was a Japanese botanist, known for his classification of monocotyledons, and of Japanese species of Hypericum.

Selected publications 
 Kimura, Y. 1953. The system and phylogenetic tree of plants. J. Jpn. Bot. 28: 97–104.
 Kimura, Y. 1956. Système et phylogénie des monocotyledones. Notulae Systematicae, Herbier du Muséum de Paris 15:137–159.
 Kimura, Y. "Shokubutsu bunrui taikei no rekishi" [The History of Botanical Classification Systems] in "Seibutsugakushi ronshu" [Essays on The History of Biology]), (Yasaka Shobo, 1987).
 Kimura, Y. "Natsurarisuto no keifu", (Chuou Kouron Sha, Inc., 1983)

Legacy 
Yojiro Kimura is the authority for 58 taxa, such as Hypericum hayatae Y.Kimura

References

Bibliography 

 
 
 
 
  in 
 
 
 Obituary: Dr. Yojiro Kimura (1912-2006). J. Jap. Bot. 82(2): 112. 2007
 Kanai, Hiroo: In Memory of Dr. Yojiro Kimura. J. Jap. Bot. 82(2): 115. 2007

20th-century Japanese botanists
1912 births
2006 deaths